In manufacturing or mechanical engineering a groove is a long and narrow indentation built into a material, generally for the purpose of allowing another material or part to move within the groove and be guided by it. Examples include:

 A canal cut in a hard material, usually metal. This canal can be round, oval or an arc in order to receive another component such as a boss, a tongue or a gasket. It can also be on the circumference of a dowel, a bolt, an axle or on the outside or inside of a tube or pipe etc. This canal may receive a circlip, an o-ring, or a gasket.
 A depression on the entire circumference of a cast or machined wheel, a pulley or sheave. This depression may receive a cable, a rope or a belt.
 A longitudinal channel formed in a hot rolled rail profile such as a grooved rail. This groove is for the flange on a train wheel.
Grooves were used by ancient Roman engineers to survey land.

See also  

 Fluting (architecture)
 Gland (engineering)
 Glass run channel
 Groove (joinery)
 Grooved rail
 Labyrinth seal
 Tongue and groove
 Tread

References 
Metalworking terminology